A chimichanga is a deep-fried burrito that is common in Tex-Mex and other Southwestern U.S. cuisine. The dish is typically prepared by filling a flour tortilla with various ingredients, most commonly rice, cheese, beans, and a meat such as machaca (dried meat), carne adobada (marinated meat), carne seca (dried beef), or shredded chicken, and folding it into a rectangular package. It is then deep-fried, and can be accompanied by salsa, guacamole, or sour cream.

Origins

The origin of the chimichanga is uncertain. From the Mexican term , one account adduces that Sonoran immigrants brought the dish with them to Arizona. Instead, most researchers agree that the chimichanga was created by accident at a Mexican restaurant in Arizona, United States, although they disagree over precisely where.

According to one source, Monica Flin, the founder of the Tucson, Arizona, restaurant El Charro, accidentally dropped a burrito into the deep-fat fryer in 1922. She immediately began to utter a Spanish profanity beginning "chi..." (chingada), but quickly stopped herself and instead exclaimed , a Spanish equivalent of "thingamajig". Knowledge and appreciation of the dish spread slowly outward from the Tucson area, with popularity elsewhere accelerating in recent decades. Though the chimichanga is now found as part of the Tex-Mex cuisine, its roots within the U.S. are mainly in Tucson, Arizona.

Woody Johnson, founder of Mexican restaurant chain Macayo's Mexican Kitchen, claimed he had invented the chimichanga in 1946 when he put some burritos into a deep fryer as an experiment at his original restaurant Woody's El Nido, in Phoenix, Arizona. These "fried burritos" became so popular that by 1952, when Woody's El Nido became Macayo's, the chimichanga was one of the restaurant's main menu items. Johnson opened Macayo's in 1952. Although no official records indicate when the dish first appeared, retired University of Arizona folklorist Jim Griffith recalls seeing chimichangas at the Yaqui Old Pascua Village in Tucson in the mid-1950s.

Nutritional value
According to data presented by the United States Department of Agriculture, a typical 183-gram (6.5-ounce) serving of a beef and cheese chimichanga contains 443 calories, 20 grams protein, 39 grams carbohydrates, 23 grams total fat, 11 grams saturated fat, 51 milligrams cholesterol, and 957 milligrams of sodium.

See also
 List of tortilla-based dishes

References

External links 

Cuisine of the Southwestern United States
Mexican cuisine
Deep fried foods
New Mexican cuisine
Street food
Tex-Mex cuisine
Tortilla-based dishes